Jean-Jacques Marcel (13 June 1931 – 3 October 2014) was a French international footballer who played midfielder. He was an integral part of the French national teams of the 1950s.

Playing career
The south Frenchman was signed in 1949 by the FC Sochaux and in their youth team but fast played to the first. Jean Jacques Marcel was a physically strong right runner with qualities both in the defensive and in the play forward, had a hard shot and a good head ball play – 76 goals in over 420 league plays were unusual in that time for a midfielder. Still playing for France U-21, he was for the first time called in France first team1953 due to his constant achievements.

In 1954 he moved to its homeland region with Olympique Marseille and remained there for five years, playing alongside 17 years older Larbi Ben Barek. He played then one year in Toulon before ending his professional career in 1965 with RCF Paris.

He won no titles, for not playing for big teams of the French championship, contrary to his teams in France national football team.

International player
Between May 1953 and October 1961 Jean-Jacques Marcel appeared in 44 international matches for the France national football team (10 in its time with Sochaux, 24 with Marseille, 3 with Toulon and 7 with Paris). He scored three goals and was in four meetings also captain. Its place in the national team was undisputed in all the years; thus he played naturally in the FIFA World Cup 1954 and 1958. The third place with France in Sweden was at the same time the largest success of its career. He also played at the first European championship (1960 in France). Until 1959 it formed a talented middle row together with Armand Penverne, in which Marcel – differently than in its clubs – played usually on the left side.

Personal life
In 1965 Marcel returned to its birth city and played still some years as an amateur with the club, from which he had come out. It vocationally supported first its father, at that time mayor of Brignoles, in its trade in wine; subsequently, he worked as a representative of the sports article manufacturer Le Coq Sportif. Marcel lived withdrawn, but still in the small town between Fréjus and Aix-en-Provence.

Death
On 3 October 2014, it was announced by his former football club that Marcel died. He was 83.

References

External links
Profile on French federation official site
 

1931 births
2014 deaths
Association football midfielders
French footballers
France international footballers
France under-21 international footballers
FC Sochaux-Montbéliard players
Olympique de Marseille players
SC Toulon players
Racing Club de France Football players
Ligue 1 players
1954 FIFA World Cup players
1958 FIFA World Cup players
1960 European Nations' Cup players